Royal Air Force Little Staughton or more simply RAF Little Staughton is a former Royal Air Force station located  south of Great Staughton, Cambridgeshire and  west of St Neots, Cambridgeshire, England.

Station history

The airfield was first handed over to the United States Army Air Forces (USAAF) in 1942.
1st Bomb Wing USAAF
2nd Advanced Air Depot USAAF
RAF Little Staughton was returned to the Royal Air Force (RAF) on 1 March 1944
 No. 47 Group Communications Flight
 No. 48 Group Communications Flight
 No. 2731 Squadron RAF Regiment
 No. 2746 Squadron RAF Regiment
 Path Finder Force 8 Group - No. 109 Squadron RAF from 2 April 1944 with the de Havilland Mosquito XVI before being disbanded on 30 April 1945.
 Path Finder Force 8 Group - No. 582 Squadron RAF formed at the airfield on 1 April 1944 with the Avro Lancaster Mks I and III before being disbanded on 10 September 1945.

The airfield was placed into care and maintenance in 1945, and during the 1950s the United States Air Force extended the runway for use by jet aircraft in emergency circumstances. However, in the late 1950s they moved out.

See also
 List of former Royal Air Force stations

Current use
The site is mainly for farming with the hangars used for various uses. In January 2020, Little Staughton Airfield and Industrial Park applied for planning permission to develop the site to re-open the airfield.

References

Citations

Bibliography

Royal Air Force stations in Bedfordshire
Royal Air Force stations in Huntingdonshire
Royal Air Force stations in Cambridgeshire
Royal Air Force stations of World War II in the United Kingdom
Great Staughton